Zelilan (also Romanized as Z̄elīlān; also known as Zelīān) is a village in Solduz Rural District, in the Central District of Naqadeh County, West Azerbaijan Province, Iran. At the 2006 census, its population was 224, in 40 families.

References 

Populated places in Naqadeh County